The silver perch (Bidyanus bidyanus) is a medium-sized freshwater fish of the family Terapontidae endemic to the Murray-Darling river system in south-eastern Australia.

Taxonomy
The silver perch's scientific name comes from an aboriginal name for the species – bidyan – recorded by Major Mitchell on the Barwon River on his 1832 expedition. (Mitchell's original scientific name for the species was Cernua Bidyana.) Silver perch are not a "true" perch of the genus Perca, but are instead a member of  Terapontidae  or 'grunter' family.

The silver perch is the only major representative of the family Terapontidae in the southern Murray-Darling system, compared to northern tropical systems where terapontid species are common. Another small terapontid, the spangled perch (Leiopotherapon unicolor), does occur sporadically in the northern Murray-Darling Basin.

Common names for Bidyanus bidyanus include silver perch, black or silver bream and the aboriginal names 'bidyan' (northern NSW) and 'tcheri/tcheeri' (South Australia).

Description

The silver perch is a large grunter with a small head, small eyes, a small mouth at the end of a pointed 'beak-like' snout. The species is streamlined and laterally compressed, with a spiny dorsal fin of medium height, angular soft dorsal and anal fins and a forked tail. Large specimens become very deep bodied with a large hump behind the head. In terms of colouration, they are dark grey to silvery greyish-brown on the back, silver-grey on the sides, with darker scale margins giving a checkered pattern; the belly is whitish; the dorsal and caudal fins are dark, the pelvic fins white.

Diet

Silver perch are opportunistic feeders, feeding on insect larvae, molluscs, annelid worms and algae. The importance of vegetative matter in the diet of silver perch is still debated. Silver perch appear primarily to be a low-order predator of small aquatic invertebrate prey, with occasional intakes of small fish and vegetative matter. In aquaria, silver perch are reported to take blood worms readily.

Distribution
Silver perch are schooling mid-water fish with a preference for flowing water. Though nowadays found in the lowland reaches of the Murray-Darling system, they originally had a strong presence in the slope and upland reaches of many Murray-Darling rivers as well. In particular, they had a strong presence in upland reaches of the Murrumbidgee River and were originally found as far upstream as Cooma. As recently as the early 1980s, long summer migrations into the upland reaches of the Murrumbidgee were an annual event. Unfortunately these migrations, and these populations, have now collapsed — silver perch are functionally extinct in the Murrumbidgee River now, as in most parts of their former range.

Silver perch have been introduced into the Lake Eyre Basin in arid central Australia. These releases were not officially sanctioned and pose serious hybridisation risks to closely related species of terapontids endemic to the Lake Eyre system.

A translocated and reproducing population of silver perch exists in Cataract Dam on the Hawkesbury-Nepean system. This population was established by NSW Fisheries translocations of juvenile fish from drying billabongs in the lower Murrumbidgee River in approximately 1915–17. The Cataract Dam population is unique in being the only population of silver perch in an artificial impoundment that regularly and successfully recruits and is self-sustaining. The long established prohibition on fishing, the consequent absence of exotic fish and their diseases, and the pristine nature of the dam, including a largely undisturbed, thickly-forested sandstone-dominated catchment and an abundance of coarse rubble and gravel in many inshore areas, where fertilised eggs can settle and not be smothered by silt, are all likely contributors to this unique situation.

Fishing

Fishermen caught silver perch on unweighted baits such as worms and on small spinning-blade lures in rapids during migrations into upland rivers, as well as flowing and moving waters more generally. They were renowned for being very fast and strong fighting fish.

The [fishing] rod is … used amongst the bream [silver perch] which run up to six pounds, and fight every inch of their way from the time they are struck till they are safely landed. … It is as easy to land a fifteen pound cod as it is a five pound bream, as the latter is notoriously the hardest fighter in our rivers, only being even nearly approached by the catfish.

Spawning and biology

Male silver perch reach sexual maturity at three years of age. Female silver perch reach sexual maturity at five years of age. Silver perch spawn in late spring and early summer. Originally water temperatures of close to 24 degrees Celsius were considered necessary for spawning to occur but as with all Murray-Darling fish species it has become apparent that the "required" spawning temperature is flexible and that they can and do spawn at lower temperatures. Researchers in the Barmah Forest region of the Murray River have collected drifting fertilised silver perch eggs in water temperatures as low as 17.2 degrees and as high as 28.5 degrees C, between early November and mid-February. Eggs were consistently collected in water temperatures above 20 degrees.

Silver perch are moderately fecund, with egg counts commonly around 200,000 to 300,000. Spawning occurs at the surface at dusk or the first few hours of night. The female sheds the eggs and the male fertilizes them in a few seconds of vigorous thrashing. The eggs are semi-buoyant and will sink without significant current, and take 24 to 36 hours to hatch.

A 1914 account describes a unique observation of silver perch spawning in the wild in the Murrumbidgee River:

The observer of a shoal engaged in distributing ova says: “Between 50 and 70 silver perch were playing—some feeding at the surface and others swimming about apparently aimlessly—in a series of eddies under a precipitous bank of the Murrumbidgee River, at a spot where the water was 10 or 12 foot deep. A section of the shoal, mostly the largest fish, remained in a central position. Suddenly, as though preconcerted, all the fish swam rapidly into a centre, splashing the water, in all directions, and becoming for an instant invisible owing to the agitation of the surface. Next moment the water all around and below the fish had assumed a whitish, opaque tinge, as though a bucket of milk had been thrown in; clearly caused by the extrusion of the milt of the male fish, and its contact with the colourless ova thrown out by the female fish. The operation was repeated five or six times at intervals of about 20 to 30 minutes. Soon after sundown the fish disappeared.” The eggs of the silver perch are demersal and adhere to submerged roots, rushes, &c., in the vicinity of the eddies described. The observer considered what he had seen to be complete evidence of the spawning.

Silver perch continue the trend in native fish of southeast Australia of having high potential longevity. Longevity is a survival strategy in the often challenging Australian environment to ensure that most adults participate in at least one exceptional spawning and recruitment event, which are often linked to unusually wet La Niña years and may occur only every one or two decades. Silver perch can be relatively long-lived; the oldest individual aged so far was sampled from Cataract Dam, NSW (where a vitally important, self-sustaining, translocated population survives) and calculated to be 27 years old through otolith examination, while Murray River fish have been aged to 17 years old. However, recent (2017) research unexpectedly found only a small proportion of silver perch in the surviving Murray River population older than seven years of age. It is not clear if these results are simply the result of extreme blackwater fish kills in the Murray River between 2010–2012, the result of some other human/management impact, or a true expression of the species' biology. The latter is doubtful as extensive sampling of the same population in the 1990s found a normal age structure with fish up to 17 years of age. More concerning is the possibility this represents a new impact that is not understood on an already imperilled species, creating a narrowed window of time for breeding and recruitment (recalling females only reach sexual maturity at 5 years of age). The finding has sparked fresh concerns about their conservation in a heavily regulated river system and some changes in management.

Conservation

As recently as the 1970s, silver perch abounded in the entire Murray-Darling Basin, vast though it is. Since then, however, they have undergone a mysterious, rapid and catastrophic decline. Silver perch have now declined close to the point of extinction in the wild. Based on simple catchment area estimates, the silver perch has disappeared from 87% of its former range. Only one sizeable, clearly viable and self-sustaining population now survives in their natural range, in the central reaches of the Murray River. For these reasons, the Australian federal government has listed wild silver perch as critically endangered under national environmental law. Silver perch are bred extensively in aquaculture but these domesticated strains and captive populations are of little use in ensuring the species' survival in the wild. Such aquacultured silver perch are regularly stocked into numerous artificial impoundments where, without exception, they fail to establish self-sustaining populations.

Reasons for the catastrophic decline of silver perch are only partially understood.  Dams, weirs and river regulation and the virtual removal of spring floods appear to have removed the conditions silver perch need to breed and recruit successfully on a large scale. Weirs are also believed to have blocked the migrations of spawning adults and juveniles, which are important to maintain populations over the lengths of rivers. Weirs also kill most drifting silver perch larvae that pass through them, if they are of an undershot design (which, unfortunately, most are). Recent studies that has proven more than 90% of silver perch passing through undershot weirs are killed. And without doubt, weirs trap drifting silver perch eggs (and larvae) as well, where they are either diverted down irrigation offtakes, resulting in eventual death, or sink into fine weir pool sediments and die.

It is not widely appreciated that silver perch eggs sink in still water; silver perch eggs are often inaccurately described as simply being pelagic, or "floating". The eggs may actually settle onto the substrate in the wild and should perhaps be considered benthic in many circumstances rather than pelagic. This may be a factor in their recent serious declines; silver perch may rely on their eggs settling onto clean, well oxygenated substrates of coarse sediments. In this era of flow regulation and flood curtailment by dams, which control the flood events that remove fine sediment, and chronic siltation from poor agricultural practices, the eggs may now frequently land in anoxic fine sediment and organic matter — including in weir pools — and fail to survive. It may be that the section of the central Murray River that supports the last clearly viable natural population of silver perch primarily does so because it supplies a sufficiently long stretch of weir-free river, under standard regulated flows, for eggs to successfully complete their drift and hatch larvae into relatively natural, suitable riverine habitats for survival.

Suspicions are also mounting that there is competition for food between introduced carp and silver perch at larval, juvenile and adult stages. Competition at the larval stage is considered the most serious. Indeed, suspicions are mounting that introduced carp are having very large impacts on a number of native Murray-Darling fish species due to competition at the larval stage, and that these impacts have so far been underestimated.

Exotic pathogens such as EHN virus and possibly similar viruses, introduced via importation of non-native fish, are now strongly suspected of playing pivotal role in the species' decline, and may explain the suspicious, very rapid collapse of some populations (e.g. upper Murrumbidgee).

In a positive development, since 2000, the installation of fishways in many Murray River weirs, so that native fish can pass through them and successfully migrate long distances again, and recent carefully managed environmental flow events, have seen silver perch numbers in the last remaining viable population increase strongly, and seen the population expand slightly in geographic range.

References

External links
 Fishes of Australia : Bidyanus bidyanus
 Native Fish Australia : Silver perch

bidyanus
Fish of the Murray-Darling basin
Fish described in 1838
Taxa named by Thomas Mitchell (explorer)